César Gonçalves de Brito Duarte (born 21 October 1964), known as César Brito, is a retired Portuguese footballer who played as a striker.

Club career
Born in the village of Barco in Covilhã, Brito started playing for local Sporting Clube, but soon attracted attention from S.L. Benfica, which signed the player in 1985. At the latter he had a difficult start, going on to serve a two-year loan at fellow Primeira Liga side Portimonense SC.

Upon his return, Brito appeared mainly from the bench, barred by Swede Mats Magnusson. During the 1990–91 season his biggest moment at Benfica arrived, as he scored twice – as a substitute – to beat FC Porto away (2–0) and eventually clinch the national title, in a match that ended in a riot.

Brito eventually left Benfica in the 1995 summer, after a ten-year link and only 23 league appearances in his last three seasons combined. After a good year at Lisbon neighbours C.F. Belenenses he moved to Spain, teaming up with a host of compatriots at UD Salamanca, including attacking partner Pauleta. In his debut campaign, already aged 32, he netted 15 goals in the second level, helping the club clinch La Liga promotion while combining with Pauleta for 34 successful strikes (the pair finished joint-first and fourth in the scoring charts).

In 1997–98, Brito appeared regularly as Salamanca eventually stayed in the top flight, then moved to modest CP Mérida in division two. He saw out his career at his very first club, retiring at almost 36.

International career
Brito earned 14 caps for the Portugal national team during four years, and scored twice.

|}

Honours
Benfica
Primeira Liga: 1986–87, 1988–89, 1990–91, 1993–94

References

External links

1964 births
Living people
People from Covilhã
Portuguese footballers
Association football forwards
Primeira Liga players
Liga Portugal 2 players
S.C. Covilhã players
S.L. Benfica footballers
Portimonense S.C. players
C.F. Os Belenenses players
La Liga players
Segunda División players
UD Salamanca players
CP Mérida footballers
Portugal under-21 international footballers
Portugal international footballers
Portuguese expatriate footballers
Expatriate footballers in Spain
Portuguese expatriate sportspeople in Spain
Sportspeople from Castelo Branco District